Michael Tronborg Kristensen (born 3 July 1983) is a Danish former professional cyclist.

Major results

2003
 1st Stage 2 Doble Copacabana GP Fides
 3rd Road race, National Road Championships
2006
 1st Stage 2 Arden Challenge
2007
 3rd Chrono Champenois
2008
 1st Rogaland Grand Prix
 1st Duo Normand (with Martin Mortensen)
 2nd Omloop van het Houtland
 3rd Post Cup
2010
 3rd Dwars door het Hageland

References

External links

1983 births
Living people
Danish male cyclists